Jon Lord (1941–2012) was an  English orchestral and rock composer, and member of Deep Purple

Jon or Jonathan Lord may also refer to:
Jon Lord (politician) (1956–2014), Canadian politician
Jonathan Lord (born 1962), British MP for Woking
Jonathan Lord (criminal)

See also
John Lord (disambiguation)